Kostiuk or Kostyuk is a surname of Ukrainian origin. It is a patronym, that is to say, it is derived from the personal name of the father of the initial bearer. In this instance, this surname derives from the personal name "Kosty, Kost", and the Ukrainian diminutive suffix "uk". Thus, the surname Kostiuk can be interpreted as "son or descendant of Kosty or Kost". The name Kosty or Kost is a pet form of the male given name Konstanty, which is rendered in English as "Constantine", a derivation of the Latin name "Contantinus", from "constans, constantis" meaning steadfast, faithful". The name was popular in continental Europe as having been borne by the first Christian ruler of the Roman Empire, Constantine the Great (280-337), in whose honour Byzantium was renamed Constantinople. Among the numerous variants of this surname are Kosty, Kosciuszko, Kosciuszkiewicz, Kosciuszkowicz, Koskiewicz, Kostka and Kostecki.

References to Kostiuk are found in the variant form Kosty, that being the surname of a noble family from Poland who was ennobled in 1790. Another reference mentions a family named Kostka who was a sept of the great clan Dabrowa. The ancestral seal of this family was located in the region of Mazovia where they were recorded in 1464. A member of this house, Stanislaw, was the governor of Chelmno, and faithful servant of King Zygmunt I. He became famous for his courage at the battle of Wisniowierz against the Tartars. He died in 1555. Jan Kostka was the governor of Sandomiers and died in 1581. Among the aristocracy of Poland was also listed a family named Kostkiewicz, who was a sept of the clan Rogala.

Blazon of Arms
Azure, a horseshoe argent, ensigned by a cross plate or, placed in pale, and two crosses plate fitche of the last, placed in bend and in bend sinisterwise.

Crest: Issuing from a crowned helmet, a wing sable, transfixed by an arrow argent, placed in fess, the point towards the sinister.

People
People with the name include:
Iurii Kostiuk (born 1977), Ukrainian biathlete
Marta Kostyuk (born 2002), Ukrainian tennis player
Mike Kostiuk (1919–2015), American football offensive lineman
Platon Kostiuk, Ukrainian neurobiologyst and electrophysiologyst
Tatiana Kostiuk (born 1982), Ukrainian chess player

References
 The Historical Research Center

See also
 
Kostyuk

Ukrainian-language surnames
Surnames of Ukrainian origin